Homalomitrinae is a subfamily of flies belonging to the family Sphaeroceridae.

Genera
 Homalomitra Borgmeier, 1931
 Sphaeromitra Roháček & Marshall, 1998

References

Sphaeroceridae
Brachycera subfamilies